Heath End may refer to several places in the United Kingdom:
 Heath End, Buckinghamshire
 Heath End, Hampshire
 Heath End, Surrey
 Heath End, Walsall, an area in Walsall
 Heath End, West Sussex, a place in West Sussex
 Heath End, Nuneaton, an area in Nuneaton